Hans Christian is a brand of heavilybuilt cruising sailboats.

History
Most designs are credited to Robert H. Perry, Harwood Ives, Scott Sprague and Tommy Chen. Boat production began in the early 1970s.

In the mid 1980s Hans Christian Yachts commissioned the designing of a new series of boats based on a more modern hull design with the goal of the "ultimate cruising sailboat."  The end result was the Christina series with the 52 and 48 models designed by Doug Peterson and Scott Sprague designing 40 and 43 versions. Construction was done in Taiwan at Horng Bin Marine Yacht boat yard and in the early 1990s the molds and construction were moved to Thailand.

Hans Christian today
In November 2004 production of the traditional range of Hans Christian Yachts was transferred from Andersen Yachts Ltd to Pantawee Marine Co., Ltd.

In February 2017 Pantawee Marine Co., Ltd officially discontinued building the traditional range of Hans Christian sailing yachts including the 33T, 38MkII, 41T, 48T and Christina 43' to make way for production of other types of craft including catamarans under new management.

Models
 Hans Christian 33 Traditional
 Hans Christian 34 C
 Hans Christian 38
 Hans Christian 38.5
 Hans Christian 41 Traditional
 Hans Christian 43 Center Cockpit
 Hans Christian 43 Ketch
 Hans Christian 43 Sloop
 Hans Christian 43 Traditional Keel
 Hans Christian 44
 Hans Christian Christina 40
 Hans Christian Christina 43
 Hans Christian Christina 48
 Hans Christian Christina 52

See also
 List of sailboat designers and manufacturers

References

External links
 Pantawee Marine - Exclusive Builder of Hans Christian 
 Hans Christian Owners Association website
 Overview of the Hans Christian 38 Traditional, and its history at sailboat.guide
 Southern California PHRF (Rating Board)
 Heart of GLASS, Fiberglass Boats And The Men Who Made Them by Daniel Spurr pages 244 - 250

Hans Christian Yachts
1973 establishments in Thailand
2017 disestablishments in Thailand